William Dennis (1856–1920) was an Independent Conservative member of the Senate of Canada.
William Henry Dennis (1887–1954), his nephew and Canadian Conservative senator from 1912 to 1920

William or Billy Dennis may also refer to:
Billy Dennis (English footballer) (1896–1952), English footballer
Willie Dennis (1926–1965), American jazz musician
Willie D (born 1966), rapper
Bill Dennis (born 1935), NASCAR driver
William Lockyer Dennis (1853–1919), English-born American politician
William M. Dennis (1810–1882), American businessman and politician
William S. Dennis (fl. 1910s), American captain of the Vanitie yacht in the America's Cup trials
Will Dennis (born 2000), English footballer

See also